Nautilia nitratireducens is a Gram-negative thermophilic, chemosynthetic, anaerobic bacterium from the genus of Nautilia which has been isolated from a hydrothermal vent from the East Pacific Rise.

References

External links
Type strain of Nautilia nitratireducens at BacDive -  the Bacterial Diversity Metadatabase

Campylobacterota
Bacteria described in 2010